The 1917 Penn Quakers football team represented the University of Pennsylvania in the 1917 college football season. The Quakers finished with a 9–2 record in their second year under head coach Bob Folwell. Significant games included victories over Michigan (16–0), Carlisle (26–0), and Cornell (37–0), and losses to undefeated national champion Georgia Tech (41–0) and Pittsburgh (14–6).  The 1917 Penn team outscored its opponents by a combined total of 245 to 71.

Five Penn players received honors on the 1917 College Football All-America Team.  They are: end Heinie Miller (Jack Veiock and Dick Jemison 1st teams, Walter Eckersall, 2nd team); Joseph Strauss (Jemison 1st team); guard Herbert Dieter (Paul Purman 2nd team); center Lud Wray (New York Times All-Service team, Purman 2nd team); and fullback Joseph Howard Berry, Jr. (Eckersall and Purman 1st teams, Veiock 2nd team).

Schedule

References

Penn
Penn Quakers football seasons
Penn Quakers football